The 2005 Giro del Trentino was the 29th edition of the Tour of the Alps cycle race and was held on 19 April to 22 April 2005. The race started in Mori and finished in Arco di Trento. The race was won by Julio Alberto Pérez.

General classification

References

2005
2005 in road cycling
2005 in Italian sport